Germán Andrés Gutiérrez Henao (born 16 January 1990) is a Colombian footballer who plays as a left back for Categoría Primera A club Atlético Bucaramanga.

Career

Atlético Bucaramanga
On 19 December 2019 it was confirmed, that Gutiérrez had joined Atlético Bucaramanga for the 2020 season.

Honours

Club

Junior
 Copa Colombia (2): 2015, 2017

References

Living people
1990 births
Colombian footballers
Barranquilla F.C. footballers
Atlético Junior footballers
Atlético Bucaramanga footballers
Categoría Primera A players
Association football fullbacks
Footballers from Barranquilla
21st-century Colombian people